Ladies First were an English garage girl group active in the early 2000s. Their two singles, "Messin'" and "I Can't Wait", were both top 30 hits in the UK, as well as both reaching No. 5 on the UK Dance Singles Chart.

"I Can't Wait" is a UK garage cover of the 1986 Nu Shooz hit.

Discography

Singles
"Kiss the Sunshine" (2001), Polydor
"Messin'" (2001), Polydor - UK #30
"I Can't Wait" (2002), Polydor - UK #19

References

External links

English girl groups
UK garage groups
English dance girl groups
British musical trios
Musical groups established in 2001
Musical groups disestablished in 2002
Polydor Records artists